Carmelo "Snow" Sigona (born January 29, 1968) is a graffiti artist who has made many contributions to the hip hop community. For the past 30 years, he has turned his days of tagging his name on trains, cement walls, and sides of buildings into a highly successful and professional means of business.  He has been featured in hundreds of magazines and several published books, such as The Exchange and The History of American Graffiti.

Early life 
Carmelo Sigona was born and raised in Paterson, New Jersey.  He began his graffiti exploration at the age of ten, frequently tagging signs, abandoned factories, and delivery trucks.  He was inspired by his classmates SCAT and AERO TGF, who were graffiti writers as well.  Over the years, his name began to catch light, as his work load increased.  Along the years, there have been many artists and illustrators who have had a big impact on him, such as Frank Frazetta, American artists Bernie Wrightson and Rick Griffin, Todd McFarlane, and Chuck Jones.  He sees graffiti as more than just letters and pictures braised onto a canvas.  He sees it as a form of art, and every art has a spirit.  His love for graffiti has been a spiritual journey, rather than the notion that it is a form of vandalism.

References

External links 
 - Vicious Styles Crew Snow's section
 - Interview

1968 births
Living people
American graffiti artists